Zhanna Yuhymivna Kolodub (*1 January 1930 Vinnytsia) is a Ukrainian composer and teacher, People's Artist of Ukraine (2009).

Biography 
Zhanna Kolodub graduated from the Kyiv Music School in the class of violin and the class of piano (1949), Kyiv Conservatory in the piano class of Konstantin Mikhailov (1954). Since 1952, lecturer, associate professor (1985), professor (1997) of Kyiv conservatory (NMAU).

Honored Worker of Arts of Ukraine (1996).  Laureate of the Mykola Lysenko Prize (2002), Victor Kosenko Prize, International Competition of Works for Great Instruments (Rivne), International Academic Rating of Popularity and Quality "Golden Fortune" (2002).  Member of the National Union of Composers of Ukraine, the National All-Ukrainian Music Union.

On March 5, 2009, the title "People's Artist of Ukraine" was granted for a significant personal contribution to the socio-economic and cultural development of Ukraine, active public activity, long-term conscientious work and on the occasion of the International Women's Day on March 8.

Zhanna Kolodub was married to Lev Kolodub (1930–2019), a Ukrainian composer.

Sources
 R. Sulim. Kolodub Zhanna Yukhimivna In Encyclopedia of modern Ukraine, pp..
 A. Mukha, I. Sikorska. Kolodub Zhanna Yukhimivna In Ukrainian Music Encyclopedia. T. 2, pp. 498–500

Further reading 
 Алексеева С. Наша Жанна Колодуб // Розповіді про музику. — К., 1980.
 Антон Муха. Композитори України та української діаспори. — К.,2004. 
 Клин В. Фортепіанні концерти // Музика. — 1974. — No. 3.
 Композитор Жанна Колодуб: сторінки життя і творчості / Римма Сулім. — Суми : Еллада, 2017. — 619 с., [10] арк. іл. : табл., портр. ; 22 см. — Бібліогр.: с. 554—586 (335 назв) та в підрядк. прим. — Бібліогр. творів Ж. Колодуб: с. 587–600. — 300 пр. — 
 Черкашина-Губаренко М. Творчі дебюти Жанни Колодуб. — К., 1999.

External links 
 
 Filmography 

Ukrainian composers
1930 births
Living people